The 21st Arkansas Infantry Regiment was the designation of several units of the Confederate Army during the American Civil War. They were :

 21st Arkansas Infantry Regiment (Craven's), formed May 1862, finished at Vicksburg July 1863
 21st (McCrae's) Arkansas Infantry Regiment, formed July 1863 but redesignated 15th (North-West) Arkansas Infantry Regiment

Military units and formations disambiguation pages